"Say So"  is a duet recorded by American R&B singer-songwriter PJ Morton and features additional vocals by American pop/R&B singer JoJo. The track was solely written and produced by PJ Morton. It was released on February 14, 2019, through Morton's very own label Morton Records/Empire as the lead single from Morton's sixth studio album Paul (2019). The acoustic version of the song was featured on Morton's The Piano Album (2020).

Composition
"Say So" was written by PJ Morton while also handling the song's production for his sixth studio album Paul (2019). The song includes additional vocals from American R&B singer-songwriter JoJo.  Morton also handled majority of the song's instrumentation except for bass which was played by DJ Raymond. The track was recorded with guidance by Reggie Nicholas at The Parlor recording studio in New Orleans, Louisiana. The mixing of "Say So" was done by Kevin “KD” Davis at Larrabee Studios in Los Angeles, California and eventually, the mastering was done by Will Quinnell at Sterling Sound in New York.

Accolades

Music video
The music video for "Say So" was shot on location in New Orleans with director Nathan Corrona. In describing the videos concept Morton states "I really love how the simplicity of this video matches the simplicity of the song. There are no deep lyrics. No big words. If you love me, just say so. It's such a simple sentiment that we can all relate to... I just wanted it to capture a real-life relationship". The video follows JoJo and Morton at their houses performing the song in their bedroom, Morton and JoJo are never shown together, but their "tumultuous connection is palpable". Morton packs up his things and attempts to drive away, only to return, suitcase in hand at JoJo's door.

The video made its world premiere on July 10, 2019, and debuted through NYLON magazine.

Track listing

Credits and personnel
Credits adapted from the liner notes of Paul, Morton Records.

Recording
Recorded at The Parlor, New Orleans, Louisiana
Mixed at Larrabee Studios, Los Angeles, California
Mastered at Sterling Sound, New York, NY

Personnel

 PJ Morton – vocals, writing,  producer, all instruments
 JoJo – vocals 
 Kevin “KD” Davis – mixing
 DJ Raymond – bass 
 Reggie Nicholas – recording
 Mack Major – recording assistant
 Will Quinnell – audio mastering
 Tanya James – management
 Wade Jordan – management

Charts

Release history

References

2019 songs
American contemporary R&B songs
Empire Distribution singles